Tożsamość is the ninth studio album by the Polish heavy metal band Turbo. It was released on December 13, 2004, in Poland through Metal Mind Productions. The album was recorded in 2004 in Poland. The cover art was created by Maciej Piotrowski and photographs by Grzegorz Kupczyk. The live performance on the Akustycznie bonus CD was recorded on December 16, 2003, at the Blue Note club in Poznań.

English version of the album entitled  Identity was released on February 28, 2005.

Track listing

Personnel

 Turbo
 Grzegorz Kupczyk – vocals 
 Wojciech Hoffmann – guitar, acoustic guitar, twelve-string guitar 
 Dominik Jokiel – guitar
 Bogusz Rutkiewicz – bass guitar
 Tomasz "Krzyżyk" Krzyżaniak – drums

 Production 
 Wojciech Hoffman and Turbo – production 
 Bogusz Rutkiewicz – mastering
 Artur Szalowski – mixing, sound engineering
 Tomasz Dziubiński – executive producer
 Maciej Piotrowski, Grzegorz Kupczyk, Tomasz Jankowski – photography

Charts

Monthly

Release history

References

2004 albums
Turbo (Polish band) albums
Metal Mind Productions albums
Polish-language albums